Start the Party! is a 2010 augmented reality party video game for the PlayStation 3. It utilizes the PlayStation Move controllers.  It is the first game developed by Supermassive Games and was published by Sony Computer Entertainment for release as a launch title for the PlayStation Move and was bundled with it in Asian regions excluding Japan. The game is a collection of augmented reality mini-games which use the PlayStation Eye.

Gameplay

The game first snaps a picture of the players using the PlayStation Eye, then displays a real time video feed of players their surroundings in the game. The game consists of a wide variety of mini-games, including bug-swatting and painting games, played using the PlayStation Move motion controller. In the game display, the controller often transforms into animated objects similar to the film Who Framed Roger Rabbit which features real-life people holding cartoon-like objects. The controller can transform into a variety of things depending on the game such as a cartoon tennis racket for swatting bugs, a spiky prod for popping balloons which are shown in the game as being held by the player. The game also allows for multiplayer modes with up to four different players with the use of a single PlayStation Move controller.

Reception

The game received "mixed" reviews according to the review aggregation website Metacritic.  In Japan, Famitsu gave it a score of two sevens, one six, and one seven for a total of 27 out of 40.

Sequel

A sequel, titled Start the Party! Save the World, was released for retail in Australia on November 24, 2011, and in Europe the next day; and as a downloadable game for PlayStation 3 through PlayStation Network on March 6, 2012. In the game, the player (and up to three other players) is cast as a superhero, tasked with saving the world.

Reception

The sequel received a bit more mixed reviews than the original according to Metacritic.

See also
Invizimals
The Fight: Lights Out

References

External links
Start the Party! at PlayStation.com

2010 video games
Gamebryo games
Party video games
PlayStation Move-compatible games
PlayStation Move-only games
PlayStation 3 games
PlayStation 3-only games
Sony Interactive Entertainment games
Sony Interactive Entertainment franchises
Video games developed in the United Kingdom
Supermassive Games